Bossiaea carinalis is a species of flowering plant in the family Fabaceae and is endemic to eastern Queensland. It is an erect shrub with narrow egg-shaped to lance-shaped leaves and pink to red and yellow flowers.

Description

Taxonomy
Bossiaea carinalis was first formally described in 1864 by George Bentham in Thomas Mitchell's Journal of an Expedition into the Interior of Tropical Australia.

Distribution and habitat
This bossiaea grows in woodland and forest between Bundaberg and Townsville in eastern Queensland.

Conservation status
Bossiaea carinalis is listed as of "least concern" under the Queensland Government Nature Conservation Act 1992.

References 

carinalis
Flora of Queensland
Plants described in 1848
Taxa named by George Bentham